Carter is a 2022 South Korean action thriller film directed by Jung Byung-gil. The film stars Joo Won, Lee Sung-jae, Jeong So-ri and Kim Bo-min. It was released on August 5, 2022, by Netflix.

Plot 
In the midst of a deadly pandemic caused by a virus which makes the infected patients violent and zombie-like, originating from the DMZ that has already devastated the United States and North Korea, a man wakes up in a blood-soaked bed in a motel room in Seoul, with a cross-shaped scar on the back of his head. Armed CIA agents burst in and threaten him demanding the whereabouts of Dr. Jung Byung-ho. With no recollections of his past, he doesn't know who he is or why he is there, let alone who Dr. Jung is. A female voice inside his ear which only he can hear, tells him that his name is Carter and he needs to accept her directions if he wants to live. Following her instructions, he escapes the room and enters a public bath where nearly a hundred gangsters attack and try to kill him. Thanks to his lethal fighting skills, he survives their assault.

Inside a van of NIS agents, the female voice reveals that she is Han Jung-hee who works for North Korea's Labor Party, which has partnered with South Korea to create a treatment for the virus. Dr. Jung Byung-ho, who successfully cured his own infected daughter Ha-na, leads the project based on an antibody from her. On the way to a lab in North Korea, Ha-na went missing presumably kidnapped by the CIA. Carter's mission is to rescue Ha-na and bring her back to the North Korean facility where the production of a vaccine is underway. When Carter questions his identity and why he is engaged in this mission, he is told that he is a South Korean-born naturalized citizen of North Korea who has decided to take part in the mission to save his own infected daughter. However, CIA agents who approach him claim that he is actually a former spy named Michael Bane who was believed to be dead during a mission in Syria.

After a long series of fights, Carter manages to arrive in North Korea with Ha-na where they meet Han Jung-hee and her superior, North Korean General Kim Jong-hyeok. Before Carter can complete his mission and get his memories back, General Kim betrays Jung-hee and him to launch a military coup against the North Korean government.

While Ha-na is a captive of Kim's forces and Kim works to convince Jung-hee to join the coup, Carter escapes from the soldiers assigned to kill him. Carter follows General Kim and Jung-hee to a biomedical facility where Ha-na stays, reuniting with her father Dr. Jung. Carter learns that Jung-hee is his wife and shoots Kim who threatens Jung-hee with a gun. At the same facility, they meet their infected daughter Yoon-hee who behaves violently and attacks Jung-hee. Dr. Jung injects Yoon-hee with an antidote which makes her temporarily unconscious.

After fighting against the infected patients and Kim's soldiers, they escape the facility in a jeep. The five: Carter, Jung-hee, Yoon-hee, Dr. Jung and Ha-na hope to catch a train operated by Chinese government, carrying infected people to Dandong, China. On the way, Jung-hee and Dr. Jung restore Carter's memories by activating a device implanted in the back of his head. Carter remembers that he agreed to this mission in exchange of his family's freedom and that he suggested blocking his memories to ensure that he couldn't betray the North.

Following a chase and fight with Kim's forces, the five finally manage to board the Chinese train. Yoon-hee wakes up, apparently cured from the disease. Unbeknownst to the group, as the train starts across a bridge, an explosion in a span ahead dooms it for a fall.

Cast

Main 
 Joo Won as Carter Lee / Michael Bane
 Lee Sung-jae as Kim Jong-hyuk
 Jeong So-ri as Han Jung-hee
 Kim Bo-min as Jung Ha-na
 Byeon Seo-yun as Choi Yu-jin
 Jung Jae-young as Jung Byung-ho
 Jung Hae-kyun as Kim Dong-gyu
 Camilla Belle as Agnes
 Mike Colter as Smith
 Christina Donnelly as Agent 3

Production 
In March 2021, Joo Won was confirmed to star. In May 2021, Lee Sung-jae confirmed his appearance.

Filming took place in Osong, North Chungcheong Province in late June 2021.

Reception

Viewership 
Within 3 days of release Carter recorded 27.3 million hours viewed and ranked 1 in Netflix's global Top 10 movie (non-English) category for the week of August 1 to 7, entering the Top 10 list in a total of 90 countries. At one point, the movie ranked in the global all-time top 10 but fell out with 65.39 million hours watched in the first 28 days.

Critical response 
  Kim Na-yeon of Star News praised the direction of action scenes such as making the helicopter aerial battle and skydiving fight scene in live action rather than CG and the intense action performance of Joo Won. Kim Bo-ram in her review for Yonhap News praised director for creatively weaving "breath-taking action sequences of physical combat, gun fights and large-scale helicopter stunts" but stated that "latter part of the movie, when the true story of Carter's mission is revealed, makes the majority of the parts, including the fast-paced action scenes, almost tiring." YTN's Kang Nae-ri stated that the film fails to attracts audience's immersion and the tension decreases towards the second half, but praised Joo Won for his splendid action performance and digesting title role. Writing for Sports Kyunghyang, Lee Da-won criticised the director for using Joo Won's efforts in a crude way. Lee stated that the only good thing about this movie is Joo Won's action sequences but his power lasts less than 20 minutes due to the tattered story and senseless directing.

In his review for South China Morning Post, James Marsh wrote [film's] "action feels weightless and simulated, even when propped up by Won’s insanely physical performance", described the film "dizzyingly ridiculous" and rated it with 2 out of 5 stars. Rohan Naahar writing for The Indian Express rated the film 1 out of 5, describing the film as "an action film so ridiculous that you’ll often wish that you were among the scores of faceless villains whose heads are smashed to a pulp by the film’s protagonist", and criticizing film's resemblance a video game. Kira Comerford of Ready Steady Cut called the film's editing distracting, adding "hand-to-hand combat sequences, for example, were pretty well choreographed, but because of how little you got to see thanks to the way the film was edited, they were absolutely wasted." Comerford also stated that the storyline was confusing for the vast majority of the film. Writing for Mashable Sam Haysom described the opening sequence "dizzying, fantastically choreographed, ultra-violent, and impressively filmed" so that it "leaves you feeling sea sick and a bit drained" and stated "The quantity and scale of action is both Carter's greatest strength and its greatest weakness. It's all very well done, but there's just too much of it." Concluding his review, Haysom wrote that the audience is "barely given time to draw a breath — and the film suffers for it."

Notes

External links 
 
 
 
 
 
 

2022 films
2020s Korean-language films
2020s South Korean films
Korean-language Netflix original films
South Korean action thriller films
2022 action thriller films
Films shot in North Chungcheong Province
Films about the Central Intelligence Agency
Films about amnesia
Films about infectious diseases
Films about North Korea–South Korea relations
Films set in Seoul
Films set in North Korea
One-shot films